The Howrah–Vasco da Gama Amaravati Express is an Express train belonging to South Eastern Railway zone that runs between Shalimar railway station and  in India. It is currently being operated with 18047/18048 train numbers on four days in week basis.

Introduction
The train is named after the famous capital city of Satavahana dynasty, Amaravati which stands in present-day Guntur district.

It is the only train connecting the states of West Bengal & Goa directly. The train is highly preferred by tourists and nature lovers, because it runs through the coastal goa, deccan plateau, coastal Andhra & Orissa and the spectacular Braganza Ghats of Western Ghats, where it meets the world-famous Dudhsagar Falls.

The 18047/Amaravati Express has an average speed of 53 km/hr and covers 2121 km in 40h 15m. The 18048/Amaravati Express has an average speed of 54 km/hr and covers 2121 km in 39h 30m.

Timings
The 18047/Amaravati Express departs from Shalimar railway station at 23:30 IST (Monday, Tuesday, Thursday, Saturday) and arrives  Vasco da Gama at 15:45 IST (Monday, Wednesday, Thursday, Saturday). The 18048/Amaravati Express departs from Vasco da Gama at 7:10 IST (Sunday, Tuesday, Thursday, Friday) and arrives Shalimar railway station at 22:40 IST (Monday, Wednesday, Friday, Saturday).

Halts
The important halts of the train are:

WEST BENGAL
 Shalimar railway station
 

ODISHA
 
 
 
 
 
 
 

ANDHRA PRADESH
 
 
 
 
 
 
 
 
 
 
 
 
 
 
 
 
 Giddalur
 
 Bethamcherla
 
 Maddikera
 

KARNATAKA
 
 Toranagallu
 
 Koppal
 
 
 
 
 

GOA
 
 Sanvordem

Available classes
The train has standard ICF rakes with a max speed of 110 kmph. The train consists of 20 coaches:

 1 AC II Tier
 3 AC III Tier
 9 Sleeper coaches
 3 General Unreserved
 2 Seating cum Luggage Rake
 1 High-Capacity Parcel Van
 1 Refrigerator car

At Guntakal, 4 coaches of Prashanti Nilayam Express is attached/detached as slip coaches. It consists :

 1 AC II Tier
 1 AC III Tier
 1 Sleeper class
 1 Seating cum Luggage Rake

Coach composition
Howrah–Guntakal–Howrah:

Guntakal–Vasco da Gama–Guntakal:

Traction
The train is hauled by a Santragachi-based WAP-4 electric locomotive from Howrah to Visakhapatnam Junction. From Visakhapatnam Junction, it is hauled by  Vijayawada-based WAP-4 electric locomotive up to Guntakal Junction. From Guntakal Junction, train is hauled by Gooty-based WDM-3A twin/WDG-3A twin diesel locomotive up to Vasco da Gama and vice versa.

For the Braganza Ghats, the 1:37 gradient requires the use of Bank engine on the way to Kulem to Castle Rock. The 18048/Amaravati Express gets Hubli-based WDG-4s as bankers.

Direction reversal
Train reverses its direction 1 time:

See also 
 Howrah Junction railway station
 Vasco da Gama railway station
 Amaravati Express

Notes

References

External links 
 18047, Amaravati Express
 18048, Amaravati Express

Rail transport in Howrah
Transport in Vasco da Gama, Goa
Express trains in India
Rail transport in West Bengal
Rail transport in Odisha
Rail transport in Andhra Pradesh
Rail transport in Karnataka
Rail transport in Goa
Railway services introduced in 2006